This is a list of municipalities of Quebec municipality type united township municipality (cantons unis, code=CU). It is an administrative division of Quebec defined by the Ministry of Municipal Affairs, Regions and Land Occupancy.

United township municipalities
(area is in km², population as of 2006)

The last previous united township municipalities were:
 Alleyn-et-Cawood, which changed its status to an ordinary municipality on February 7, 2004;
 Leslie-Clapham-et-Huddersfield, which changed its status to an ordinary municipality and its name to Otter Lake on December 20, 2003;
 Mansfield-et-Pontefract, which changed its status to an ordinary municipality on October 11, 2003;
 Sheen-Esher-Aberdeen-et-Malakoff, which changed its status to an ordinary municipality and its name to Sheenboro on October 11, 2003;
 Mulgrave-et-Derry, which changed its status to an ordinary municipality on August 2, 2003.

See also
 List of township municipalities in Quebec

External links 
 MAMROT Répertoire des municipalités

References 

United

United township
Quebec